Demeritte is a surname. Notable people with the surname include:

Dominic Demeritte (born 1978), Bahamian sprinter
Travis Demeritte (born 1994), American professional baseball player